Louay Chanko (born 29 November 1979) is a professional football coach and former player.

Born in Sweden, Chanko represented Sweden internationally as a midfielder, before switching allegiance to Syria. After his playing career, Chanko has worked as a coach.

International career 
In 2008, he was called up to Syria national team to play against a local league club. He received first cap for Syria at 2010 FIFA World Cup qualification against Kuwait on 8 June 2008. Earlier the same the year Chanko played for the Swedish national team in a friendly against Costa Rica.

Chanko was selected to Valeriu Tiţa's 23-man final squad for the AFC Asian Cup 2011 in Qatar. He came as a substitute in the third group game against Jordan, replacing Ali Diab in the 63rd minute.

Honours
Djurgården
 Allsvenskan: 2002
 Svenska Cupen: 2002

Malmö FF
 Allsvenskan: 2004

References

External links
 
 

1979 births
Living people
Assyrian/Syriac Syrians
Swedish people of Syrian descent
Swedish people of Assyrian/Syriac descent
Swedish football managers
Syrian footballers
Swedish footballers
Sweden international footballers
Syria international footballers
Allsvenskan players
Superettan players
Super League Greece players
Danish Superliga players
Syrianska FC players
Djurgårdens IF Fotboll players
Malmö FF players
AEK Athens F.C. players
Hammarby Fotboll players
AaB Fodbold players
Syrian expatriate footballers
Syrian Christians
Expatriate footballers in Greece
Swedish expatriate sportspeople in Greece
Expatriate men's footballers in Denmark

2011 AFC Asian Cup players
Syriac Orthodox Christians
Association football midfielders
Assyrian footballers
Dual internationalists (football)
People from Södertälje
Sportspeople from Stockholm County